O'Gorman is a surname. Notable people with the surname include:

 Áine O'Gorman (born 1989), Irish footballer
 Camila O'Gorman (1828-1848), wealthy socialite and figure of scandal in 19th century Argentina
 Chevalier O'Gorman (1732–1809), Irish soldier and genealogist
 Colm O'Gorman (born 1966), founder and director of One in Four, a national Irish charity
 Dave O'Gorman (David O'Gorman; born 1972), English football winger
 David O'Gorman (c. 1865 – 1945), Irish politician
 Dean O'Gorman (born 1976), New Zealand actor, artist, and photographer
 Denis O'Gorman (1914-2005), former Irish sportsman who played hurling with Tipperary
 Denis O'Gorman (athlete) (1928–2011), British Olympic long-distance runner
 Dick O'Gorman, Irish hurler
 Edmundo O'Gorman (1906-1995), Mexican writer, historian and philosopher
 James Aloysius O'Gorman (1860–1943), one-term United States Senator from New York
 James F. O'Gorman (born 1933), American architectural historian, taught at Wellesley College
 James Myles O'Gorman, (1804-1874), Irish-born bishop of the Catholic Church in the United States
 Joe O'Gorman (Joseph George O'Gorman; 1890–1974), British entertainer and cricketer
 John O'Gorman (born 1860s), Irish piper
 Juan O'Gorman (1905-1982), Mexican artist, painter and architect
 Kieran O'Gorman (born 1972), Irish hurler
 Larry O'Gorman (born 1968), former Irish sportsman who played hurling with Wexford in the 1990s
 Marie O'Gorman, Irish camogie player
 Mervyn O'Gorman (1871-1958), Irish-born electrical and aeronautical engineer
 Michael O'Gorman (footballer) (also known as Mick Minahan; 1874–1937), Australian rules footballer
 Michael O'Gorman (rowing) (1965–2018), American coxswain
 Ned O'Gorman (1929–2014), American poet and educator
 Noel O'Gorman (born 1944), Irish hurler
 Patrick O'Gorman, Irish Fine Gael politician
 Purcell O'Gorman (1820-1888), Irish nationalist politician and Member of Parliament in the House of Commons of the United Kingdom
 Robert O'Gorman (umpire), Australian rules football umpire
 Roderic O'Gorman (born 1983), Irish politician, Chairman of the Green Party (from 2011)
 Seán O'Gorman (born 1960), Irish hurler
 Terence O'Gorman (1919-2003), a poet from the Republic of Ireland
 Terry O'Gorman, Australian lawyer, president of the Australian Council for Civil Liberties
 Tim O'Gorman (born 1967), former cricketer who played for Derbyshire
 Thomas O'Gorman (1843–1921), American prelate of the Roman Catholic Church, Bishop of Sioux Falls (1896–1921)
 Tony O'Gorman (born 1958), Australian politician, member of the Western Australian Legislative Assembly (2001–2013)
 Wayne O'Gorman, Irish Gaelic footballer, and hurler

See also
Gorman (related surname)
O'Gorman High School (disambiguation)